Preferred Bank is a California state-chartered bank operating in Southern California, United States.

Headquartered in Los Angeles, with branch offices in Arcadia, Alhambra, Century City, Los Angeles, California, Diamond Bar, California, City of Industry, California, Anaheim, Pico Rivera, California, Irvine and Torrance, California, the publicly held community bank was first established on December 23, 1991.

The bank is listed on NASDAQ.  As a California state-chartered bank, insured by the Federal Deposit Insurance Corporation, it has consistently earned the highest ratings from financial rating agencies such as Bauer Financial, Sheshunoff, Veribanc, Inc., and The Findley Reports.

In addition to ordinary banking services, Preferred Bank also specializes in several areas to serve its predominantly Chinese American clientele, and these include:
International Market Business: consisting of importers and exporters requiring both borrowing and operational products
International Private Banking: handling international private banking needs in the Pacific Rim area
Middle Market Business: consisting of manufacturing, service and distribution companies with sales of $3 million to $50 million annually and with borrowing requirements of up to $7 million.
Professionals: consisting of physicians, accountants, attorneys, and professionals associated with the entertainment industry

History
The bank's initial offering closed December 11, 1998. 

In 2015, the bank acquired United International Bank of Flushing, New York.

References

External links
 Preferred Bank

Chinese American banks
Chinese-American culture in Los Angeles
Companies based in Los Angeles
Banks based in California
Banks established in 1991